David Berry is an Australian-Canadian actor known for his role as James Bligh in the television series A Place To Call Home and Lord John Grey in the Starz television series Outlander.

Early life
Berry was born in Toronto, Ontario, Canada, but moved to Sydney, Australia, at the age of 7. One of four children, he is talented in both singing and the violin. As a child, he attended school on a scholarship for voice, splitting his time between school and professional performances that included work at Opera Australia and numerous festivals. In 2002, he received a scholarship to study political science at Montreal's McGill University. Upon his return, he applied and was accepted to the Australian National Institute of Dramatic Art (NIDA), from which he graduated in 2010.

Career

Berry's first professional role was a guest appearance in an episode of Miss Fisher's Murder Mysteries. He went on that same year to portray Logan Meyer in a ten episode stint on 7 Network's long running soap opera Home and Away.
In 2013, Berry starred in writer/director Robert White's made for TV horror film, Progeny. He also joined the main cast of the Foxtel drama A Place To Call Home as James Bligh, a man tortured by society's treatment of his homosexuality, in 1950s Australia.

2015 saw Berry star as Brian Cleaver in The Crater: A True Story of Vietnam. The film revolves around the experiences of Cleaver during The Battle of Coral-Balmoral, fought between May 12 and June 6, 1968.

In August 2016, it was announced that Berry would be joining the cast of Starz's time travel period drama Outlander, in the recurring role of Lord John Grey. He debuted in the 2017 episode "All Debts Paid", appearing in seasons three through six.

2020 saw Berry team up with fellow actor Tim Downie on an unofficial Outlander podcast entitled Outcasts.

Filmography

Television

Film

Theatre

Awards and nominations

Personal life
Berry married Kristina Tesic in 2012. They had a son in 2016.

References

External links

Australian male actors
Canadian emigrants to Australia
Male actors from Toronto
Living people
21st-century Australian male actors
21st-century Canadian male actors
Australian male film actors
Australian male stage actors
Australian male television actors
Canadian male film actors
Canadian male stage actors
Canadian male television actors
McGill University alumni
National Institute of Dramatic Art alumni
Year of birth missing (living people)